Lusahovit is a village in the Ijevan Municipality of the Tavush Province of Armenia. The 5th-century Tsrviz Chapel is located near Lusahovit.

Toponymy 
The village was previously known as Tsrviz and Tsrrvis.

References

External links 

Populated places in Tavush Province